Torchy! is a 1956 album by jazz singer Carmen McRae arranged by Jack Pleis and Ralph Burns.

Jason Ankeny described the album as "a lush, potently atmospheric collection of romantic ballads rendered for maximum impact" and that the "...sheer intensity of McRae's vocals render orchestration virtually moot. Few singers have equaled her conviction or her fierce intelligence, and her interpretations of songs like "But Beautiful," "My Future Just Passed," and "We'll Be Together Again" pack a devastating emotional punch."

Track listing
 "Last Night When We Were Young" (Harold Arlen, Yip Harburg) - 2:38
 "Speak Low" (Kurt Weill, Ogden Nash) - 3:07
 "But Beautiful" (Jimmy Van Heusen, Johnny Burke) - 2:55
 "If You'd Stay the Way I Dream About You" (Arthur Herzog, Jr., Irene Kitchings) - 2:47
 "Midnight Sun" (Lionel Hampton, Burke, Johnny Mercer) - 3:45
 "My Future Just Passed" (Richard A. Whiting, George Marion, Jr)- 3:18
 "Yesterdays" (Jerome Kern, Otto Harbach) - 2:33
 "We'll Be Together Again" (Carl T. Fischer, Frankie Laine) - 3:04
 "I'm a Dreamer, Aren't We All" (Ray Henderson, Buddy DeSylva, Lew Brown) - 2:40
 "Good Morning Heartache" (Ervin Drake, Irene Higginbotham, Dan Fisher) - 3:20
 "Star Eyes" (Don Raye, Gene DePaul) - 3:08
 "I Don't Stand a Ghost of a Chance with You" (Victor Young, Bing Crosby, Ned Washington) - 3:10

Personnel
Carmen McRae - vocals
Ralph Burns, Jack Pleis - arranger

References

1955 albums
Carmen McRae albums
Albums arranged by Ralph Burns
Albums arranged by Jack Pleis
Decca Records albums